Dragon Eyes is a 2012 American martial arts film starring Cung Le and Jean-Claude Van Damme. It was directed by John Hyams. In New Orleans, a mysterious man looks to unite two warring gangs against the lawmen who have been using them to advance their corrupt agenda. The film was the second collaboration between Van Damme and Hyams, after Universal Soldier: Regeneration (2009).

Plot
St. Jude Square is a neighborhood living in fear and despair. The dueling gangs of local kingpins, Dash and Antoine, terrorize the streets, and the citizens live without a shred of hope until mysterious stranger, Ryan Hong (Cung Le) arrives. He begins to play one gang against the other, by calling on the teachings of his mentor, Tiano (Jean-Claude Van Damme), to find the strength to battle back. However, just as he begins to bring the community under control, Hong is confronted by Mr. V (Peter Weller), the town's corrupt police chief. At first Mr. V is impressed by Hong's skill, but soon sees Hong as a threat to his regime and the two are locked in a head to head battle, pitting the fear and corruption of Mr. V's regime against the new beginning Hong represents for the people of St. Jude Square.

Cast
Cung Le as Ryan Hong
Jean-Claude van Damme as Tiano
Peter Weller as Mr. V
Crystal Mantecón as Rosanna
Danny Mora as Grandpa George
Kris van Varenberg as Sgt. Feldman
Luis da Silva as Dash
Dan Henderson as Beating Police Officer
Rich Clementi as Devil Dog Gangster #4
Trevor Prangley as Lord

Home media
On 9 April 2012, DVD and Blu-ray disc was released by G2 Pictures in the United Kingdom in Region 2. A limited number of the DVD slipcovers in Australia were for sale from sanity.com.au and autographed by Jean-Claude Van Damme.

References

External links

2012 films
American martial arts films
Dark Castle Entertainment films
Films produced by Joel Silver
Films set in New Orleans
Mixed martial arts films
Silver Pictures films
2012 martial arts films
2010s English-language films
Films directed by John Hyams
2010s American films